Deportivo Las Sabanas is a Nicaraguan football team currently playing in the Nicaraguan Primera División. They are based in Las Sabanas.

History
The club was first founded in 2009 at Las Sabanas, during theis periodthey were crowned champion of the third division after winning 6–1 on aggregate againstBrumas FC de Jinotega.

They.

The Club won promotion to the primera division, after winning the Champions/Promotion playoff against FC Gutiérrez 3–2 2019 season and for the first time in the club history.

Current squad
Squad as of 6 November 2019.

Achievements
Segunda División de Nicaragua: 1
2019
Tercera División de Nicaragua: 1
2009

Notable players

List of Coaches
  Miguel Angel Sanchez
  Luis Vega

References

External links
 

Football clubs in Nicaragua
association football clubs established in 2009